The Battle of Meßkirch was fought on 4 May 1800 and 5 May 1800 and resulted the victory of French army against the Austrians.

Overview
See the Messkirch 1800 Order of Battle for details of the French and Austrian armies in the campaign.

On 25 April 1800, the French Armée d'Allemagne, under Jean Victor Marie Moreau, crossed the Rhine River at Kehl and Schaffhausen. The 1st Demi-Brigade, of the Corps led by Laurent de Gouvion-Saint-Cyr, conquered St. Georgen and entered the Black Forest at Freiburg im Breisgau. After conquering Stuhlingen, 25 km south of Donaueschingen, the unit took part in the Battle of Stockach and Engen on 3 May 1800, after which the Austrian retreated to Meßkirch where they enjoyed a more favourable defensive position.

The French repeatedly assaulted the town on 4 May 1800 and 5 May 1800, both attempts being in vain. The 1st Demi-Brigade, despite the Austrian superiority there, was able to conquer Krumbach and the heights surrounding it, which commanded Meßkirch. Therefore, the Austrian moved back to Sigmaringen, followed by the French. The Battle of Biberach ensued on 9 May 1800.

See also
Campaigns of 1800 in the French Revolutionary Wars

Notes

References 

 Heinrich Bücheler, Werner Fischer, Roland Kessinger: Die Schlacht bei Meßkirch 5ter Mai 1800: Gedenkband zum 200. Jahrestag. Museumsgesellschaft Meßkirch (Hrsg.). Gmeiner Verlag. Meßkirch. 1. Auflage 2000. 
 Kempf: Unsere Heimat in den Napoleonischen Kriegen. In: Derselbe: Das Gögginger Dorfbuch. Gemeinde Göggingen. Göggingen 1969. S. 365 ff.

Conflicts in 1800
Messkirch 1800
Messkirch 1800
1800 in Austria
1800 in France
1800
Messkirch (1800)
Battles of the War of the Second Coalition
1800 in the Holy Roman Empire
Battles inscribed on the Arc de Triomphe